Robert Lytle Mchatton (November 17, 1788 – May 20, 1835) was a U.S. Representative from Kentucky.

Born in Fayette County, Virginia (now Kentucky), Mchatton attended the common schools.
He engaged in agricultural pursuits. He owned slaves.
He served as a member of the State house of representatives 1814–1816.
He served as major of the Seventy-seventh Regiment of state militia in 1816.

Mchatton was elected as a Jacksonian to the Nineteenth Congress to fill the vacancy caused by the death of James Johnson.
He was reelected as a Jacksonian to the Twentieth Congress and served from December 7, 1826, to March 3, 1829.
He resumed agricultural pursuits.
He died in Marion County, Indiana, May 20, 1835.
He was interred in the Old Cemetery, Georgetown, Kentucky.

References

1788 births
1835 deaths
People from Fayette County, Kentucky
Jacksonian members of the United States House of Representatives from Kentucky
American slave owners
American militia officers
Military personnel from Kentucky